Capnodium mangiferae is a plant pathogen that causes mango black blight, forming black patches on mango leaves.

References

Fungal fruit diseases
Mango tree diseases
Capnodiaceae
Fungi described in 1876